St. Thomas Aquinas Roman Catholic Separate Regional Division No. 38 is a separate Catholic school authority in Central Alberta and is more commonly referred to as STAR Catholic Schools (an acronym used for St. Thomas Aquinas Roman).

Size and Student Transport 
The size of STAR Catholic is a small sized urban-rural division with only ten schools in six municipalities across west central Alberta. STAR contracts bussing services out to independent companies in conjunction with public school systems running services within the same community.

List of Schools

References

External links
  St. Thomas Aquinas Roman Catholic Schools

School districts in Alberta